Newag 6Dl is the first locomotive from the SM42 series, modernised to the two storage version. The locomotive is built upon the Newag 6Dg and the Newag 18D, and is able to be powered by electricity. This is the first Newag locomotive which has bumpers (shock absorbers) to accumulate collision energy.

Specification

The modernisation involved work on an entirely new body on the existing chassis, with the use of fuel tanks, which were included in the modernisation. The locomotive uses two diesel CATERPILLAR C18 engines with a capacity of 563 kW connected to synchronous generators. Each of the units, included a new exhaust system, which is supported on the refuge. The engine exhaust systems with the diesel filters are DOC types. Built-in power generators can operate in two configurations: the first uses the power of both motors for traction, the second uses the power of the traction to power the cabin of the train.

Problems 
In 2020 there has been problems with some of the locomotives produced, where some mechanism failed to work what caused the trains to be delayed or being hauled by other locomotive, in some cases there was bus transport instead

References

Standard gauge locomotives of Poland
Diesel locomotives of Poland
Fablok locomotives